Shuttleworth College is a further education college in the village of Old Warden in Bedfordshire, England. The college is part of Bedford College, and mainly offers courses and training related to agriculture and the natural environment.

History
Shuttleworth College was founded in 1944 as part of the Richard Ormonde Shuttleworth Remembrance Trust. Richard Ormonde Shuttleworth, the owner of the Old Warden Estate in Bedfordshire, England was killed in 1940 while serving with the Royal Air Force. He had a keen interest in farming and estate management; after his death, his mother Dorothy Clotilda Shuttleworth established a trust in his memory. The two principal objectives of the Trust were the establishment of the college at Old Warden Park in Bedfordshire and the development of the Shuttleworth Collection – the unique museum of veteran aeroplanes, cars and other vehicles situated next to the park.

The college enrolled its first students in 1946 and soon established its place as a national centre for agricultural education. The existing buildings at Old Warden Park provided teaching and residential facilities in the early years of the college. From 1960 to 1990 the college campus was extended by the provision of specialist teaching facilities including lecture theatres, laboratories and a conference hall, plus machinery, livestock and agronomy teaching centres. Residential accommodation was also added for 150 students to supplement that available in existing rooms at the park.

In 1988 the college joined Cranfield University, at the time Cranfield Institute of Technology. In 1996, all operations of Shuttleworth College were formally merged with Cranfield's National College of Agricultural Engineering at Silsoe, Bedfordshire, and the Old Warden campus was closed. However, the Shuttleworth Trust re-established the college in 1997, in partnership with Writtle College. Since this time Shuttleworth College has generally been a provider of further education. In August 2009, Shuttleworth left Writtle College, and became part of Bedford College.

Today
Shuttleworth now specialises in agricultural and environmental education. Courses range from work-based training and leisure programmes to full-time courses up to higher education level. Subject areas include:
 Agriculture
 Animal Science
 Countryside
 Fisheries
 Floristry
 Horse Management
 Horticulture
 Outdoor Adventure

There are also short courses and tailor-made corporate training programmes.

The college is in Old Warden Park, which has the Shuttleworth Collection, and the "Swiss Garden".

References

External links
 Shuttleworth College homepage

  

Agricultural organisations based in England
Further education colleges in Bedfordshire
Agricultural universities and colleges in the United Kingdom
Educational institutions established in 1944
Education in Central Bedfordshire District
1944 establishments in England
Grade II* listed buildings in Bedfordshire